Brigadier Dame Mary Joan Caroline Tyrwhitt, DBE, TD (22 December 1903–18 March 1997) was a British Army officer. She was the last director of the Auxiliary Territorial Service (ATS) and the first director of the Women's Royal Army Corps (WRAC) when it was established on 1 February 1949.

Her father was Sir Reginald Tyrwhitt, 1st Baronet, a Royal Navy Admiral of the Fleet.

Death
Brigadier Dame Mary Tyrwhitt died in 1997, aged 93, unmarried.

References

External links
Oxford Index
UK online

 

 

1903 births
1997 deaths
Auxiliary Territorial Service officers
Dames Commander of the Order of the British Empire
British women in World War II
Women's Royal Army Corps officers
Place of birth missing
Place of death missing
Daughters of baronets